Frank Edward Fuller [Rabbit] (January 1, 1893 – October 29, 1965) was a backup infielder in Major League Baseball, playing mainly at second base from  through  for the Detroit Tigers (1915–1916) and Boston Red Sox (1923). He was born in Detroit, Michigan. 
 
In a three-season career, Fuller was a .175 hitter (11-for-63) with 11 runs, three RBI, and six stolen bases in 40 games. He did not have any extra-base hits in his major league career.

Fuller died in  Warren, Michigan, at the age of 72.

External links
Baseball Reference
Retrosheet

Boston Red Sox players
Detroit Tigers players
Major League Baseball second basemen
1893 births
1965 deaths
Newark Bears (IL) players
San Antonio Bears players
Houston Buffaloes players
Bridgeport Bears (baseball) players
New Haven Profs players
Baseball players from Detroit